Cư Kuin is a district of Đắk Lắk province in the Central Highlands of Vietnam. The district was established in 2007. Its area is approximately 288.3 km², and its population is about 109,770 people.

Administration 
Cư Kuin is divided into eight communes, including:
 Ea Ning
 Ea Tiêu
 Ea K'Tur
 Ea Bhôk
 Hòa Hiệp
 Dray Bhăng
 Ea Hu
 Cư Êwi

Districts of Đắk Lắk province